Thorin Oakenshield (Thorin II) is a fictional character in J. R. R. Tolkien's 1937 novel The Hobbit. Thorin is the leader of the Company of Dwarves who aim to reclaim the Lonely Mountain from Smaug the dragon.  He is the son of Thráin II, grandson of Thrór, and becomes King of Durin's Folk during their exile from Erebor. Thorin's background is further elaborated in Appendix A of Tolkien's 1955 novel The Return of the King, and in Unfinished Tales.

Commentators have noted that Thorin is Old Norse both in name and character, being surly, illiberal, independent, proud, aristocratic, and like all Dwarves greedy for gold. Tolkien was a Roman Catholic; from a Christian perspective, Thorin exemplifies the deadly sin of avarice, but is able to free himself from it at the time of his death. This deathbed conversion has been compared to the moral transformation of Ebenezer Scrooge in Charles Dickens's A Christmas Carol.

Thorin appears in Peter Jackson's The Hobbit film series, in the Rankin/Bass animated version, and in the 1982 game of the same name.

Appearances

The Hobbit

In The Hobbit, Thorin, a Dwarf-King in exile and twelve other Dwarves visited Bilbo Baggins in his home in the Shire. This was on the wizard Gandalf's advice to hire Bilbo as a burglar, to help them steal their treasure back from the dragon Smaug. Smaug had attacked the Dwarves's mountain, Erebor (the Lonely Mountain) about 150 years before, and had taken both the Dwarves' mountain and their treasure. Thorin was determined to get the treasure back, and especially wanted the Arkenstone, the Heart of the Mountain, an heirloom of his Kingdom.

On the journey, the company encountered a band of trolls; Thorin was the only Dwarf  not to be taken unawares. When Gandalf had rescued the company, letting dawn turn the trolls to stone, they opened the trolls' lair. Thorin found the Elven blade Orcrist in the trolls' cache, and used the sword fighting goblins in the tunnels beneath the Misty Mountains. At the same time, Bilbo found a magic ring, using it to escape from the tunnels past the goblin guards. 

When the Dwarves were captured by the wood-elves of Mirkwood, Thorin insisted that the others not disclose their quest to their captors. Bilbo, invisible with his magic ring, evaded capture, and organised the company's escape, floating in barrels out of the wood-elves' fastness. Thorin was the first to emerge from the barrels at Lake-town, marching up to the leaders of the town, declaring himself as King Under the Mountain.

With provisions from Lake-town, Thorin led the company to Erebor. Seeing that Smaug was not there, the Dwarves reclaimed some of the treasure; Thorin gave Bilbo "a small coat of mail" made of mithril as the first instalment of his payment. The Dwarves then learnt from the ancient raven Roäc that Smaug had been killed: Bard the Bowman had managed to shoot Smaug as, furious at the Dwarves' theft of some of his treasure, the dragon set about destroying Lake-town. 

Faced with demands from Thranduil the Elvenking and Bard for a fair share of the treasure to be distributed to the wood-elves and the men of Lake-town, Thorin refused to acknowledge their right to any of the hoard. He fortified the Mountain against his new rivals and sent to his cousin Dáin Ironfoot for reinforcements. Thorin was furious when he discovered that Bilbo had stolen the Arkenstone to use as a bargaining counter, and sent him from the Mountain. Conflict amongst the Dwarves, men, and elves was averted only by an invasion of goblins and wargs, whereupon the Dwarves joined forces with the wood-elves, the men of Lake-town, and the great eagles in the Battle of Five Armies. 

During the battle, Thorin was mortally wounded, but he made his peace with Bilbo before he died.
When Thorin died, he was buried with the Arkenstone, and Orcrist was returned and laid upon his tomb.  The blade would glow blue should Orcs approach, and they could thus not take the Mountain by surprise. Thorin was succeeded as leader of Durin's Folk by his cousin Dáin.

The Lord of the Rings
Part III of Appendix A in The Return of the King gives an overview of the history of Durin's Folk and more of Thorin's background. When Thorin was 53 (young for a Dwarf), he marched with a mighty dwarf-army against the orcs of Moria. After the battle he led his people to establish a foothold in the Blue Mountains west of the Shire.

Unfinished Tales
Unfinished Tales elaborates on Thorin's reasons for accepting Bilbo into his company. As depicted in the story "The Quest of Erebor", Thorin met with Gandalf in Bree shortly before the quest began.  Gandalf persuaded him that stealth, rather than force, was needed to infiltrate Erebor; they would therefore need a burglar. Gandalf feared that Sauron could use Smaug as a weapon, and was concerned that Thorin's pride and quick temper would ruin the mission to destroy the dragon. He thought that Bilbo would be a calming influence on Thorin, as well as a genuinely valuable addition to the company. Thorin, who did not think much of Hobbits, reluctantly agreed, calculating that Bilbo's presence would be a small price to pay for Gandalf's help.

Origins

Tolkien adopted Thorin's names from the Dvergatal, the list of Dwarves, in the Old Norse poem "Völuspá", which is part of the Poetic Edda. The name "Thorin" (Þorinn) appears in stanza 12, where it is used for a dwarf, and the name "Oakenshield" (Eikinskjaldi) in stanza 13. The name "Thorin" ultimately derives from that of the Norse god Thor; it means darer or bold one.
 The names also appear in Snorri Sturluson's Prose Edda.

Dwarfs in Germanic folklore are skilled in metalwork, including making weapons, ships, rings and jewellery; they are knowledgeable, strong, and turn to stone in sunlight. They are characterised as having a strong association with gold, mining, wealth, living underneath mountains, and being long-lived, ungrateful, and getting into arguments about payment. The Tolkien critic Tom Shippey suggests that Tolkien's "master-text" for his Dwarves was the Hjaðningavíg. In that legend, the Dwarves are characterised by revenge, as in "the long and painful vengeance of [Thorin's father] Thráin for [Thorin's grandfather] Thrór", and Shippey argues that Tolkien chose these qualities for his Dwarves.

Interpretations

Shippey writes that in chapters 6–8 of The Hobbit, Tolkien explores "with delight that surly, illiberal independence often the distinguishing mark of Old Norse heroes". The philosophers Gregory Bassham and Eric Bronson contrast the way Tolkien introduces hobbits, as "plain, quiet folks who never do anything unexpected", with how Thorin would have "introduce[d] himself, with aristocratic titles and songs of ancient lineage. We do not open the book to read of the wrath of Thorin the way we learn of the wrath of Achilles in the opening lines of The Iliad." 

The Tolkien scholar Paul H. Kocher writes that Tolkien characterises Dwarves as having the "cardinal sin of 'possessiveness'", seen sharply when Bard the Bowman makes what Bilbo feels is a fair offer for a share of Smaug's treasure, and Thorin flatly refuses, his "dwarfish lust for gold fevered by brooding on the dragon's hoard".

The Jesuit John L. Treloar, writing in Mythlore, suggests that Tolkien, a Catholic, explores the seven deadly sins in his Middle-earth writings. He states that in The Hobbit, both Smaug and Thorin exemplify avarice, but respond to it differently. In his view, Smaug is evil and lets avarice destroy him, whereas Thorin, sharing the general weakness of Dwarves for this particular vice, nevertheless has sufficient good will to free himself of it at the time of his death.

Bassham and Bronson compare Thorin's deathbed "conversion" from his greed and pride, as he reconciles himself with Bilbo, to Ebenezer Scrooge's "big moral transformation" from grumpy miserliness to generosity and cheerfulness in Charles Dickens's 1843 novella A Christmas Carol.

Adaptations

In the 1977 animated version of The Hobbit, Thorin is voiced by Hans Conried.

In Soviet 1985 television play Сказочное путешествие мистера Бильбо Беггинса Хоббита ("The Fantastic Journey of the Hobbit Mr. Bilbo Baggins") Thorin was played by Anatoly Ravikovich.

In Peter Jackson's three-film adaptation of The Hobbit (2012–2014), Thorin is portrayed by Richard Armitage. The film adaptation adds to Thorin's quest an arch-enemy in the form of the villainous orc leader Azog, as well as a history of enmity with Thranduil, which began with a dispute between his grandfather Thrór and the Elvenking over the White Gems of Lasgalen. In his review, Erik Kain from Forbes wrote that Thorin stood out as a remarkable character with shades of dark and light, at once heroic and stubborn to a fault.

In the 1982 game The Hobbit Thorin appears as an AI controlled character and one of his seemingly random actions ("Thorin sits down and starts singing about gold", which occurs when the player does nothing for a while) became quite famous. In the 2003 video game, Thorin is voiced by Clive Revill.

Family tree

Notes

References

Primary
This list identifies each item's location in Tolkien's writings.

Secondary

Sources

External links

Middle-earth Dwarves
Middle-earth rulers
Fictional kings
Characters in The Hobbit
Literary characters introduced in 1937